Karl-Johan Erling Göran Persson (born 25 March 1975) is a Swedish billionaire businessman, and the chair and former president and CEO of the fashion company Hennes & Mauritz (H&M), founded by his grandfather Erling Persson. As of March 2022, according to Forbes, his estimated net worth is US$1.5 billion.

Early life
Persson attended the European Business School in London from 1996, majoring in Business and Economics. He graduated in 2002.

Career
In 2001, Persson purchased an events management business, which established itself as the leading events management company in Scandinavia. The business was successfully sold in 2007 to MCI. In 2005, he joined H&M in an operational role, working his way up to head of expansion and head of business development in 2007, before being appointed CEO in 2009 to succeed Rolf Eriksen. He was replaced by Helena Helmersson in January 2020.

Personal life
He is married to Leonie Gillberg, they have two children, and live in Stockholm, Sweden. Crown Princess Victoria of Sweden attended their wedding in 2002.

Persson is a supporter of Stockholm-based football club Djurgårdens IF and has also been supporting the club financially.

References

External links 

 

1975 births
Living people
Swedish chief executives
Swedish billionaires
Swedish businesspeople in fashion
People educated at Enskilda Gymnasiet
Alumni of European Business School London
Karl-Johan